Sandeep Tomar (born in Malakpur village, Baghpat district, Uttar Pradesh) is an Indian male wrestler who competes in the men's freestyle 55 kg category.

Sandeep Tomar on 24 April 2016, secured an Olympic quota place for India in the men's 57 kg freestyle category with a bronze medal finish on the final day of the 1st World Olympic Qualifying tournament, Mongolia, defeating Ukrainian wrestler Andriy Yatsenko with a dominating 11-0 show. He became the fourth Indian wrestler after Yogeshwar Dutt (men's 65 kg freestyle), Narsingh Yadav (men's 74 kg freestyle), and Hardeep Singh (Greco-Roman 98 kg) to book a berth for the Rio Olympic Games, to be held later this year. He comes from a jaat family. Name of coach- Kuldeep Singh since 2011

Career

2012 National Wrestling Championships 
Tomar won the gold medal at the National Championships in the 55 kg category. The 21-year-old Navy grappler was a National junior champion in 2011. He then won the men’s 55 kg freestyle gold on his second attempt. He had finished fifth in his debut year in 2011.

Tomar defeated Nitin, a silver medal winner in the Hari Ram Indian Grand Prix with a 1-1, 3-0 scoreline.

2012 Copa Brasil 
At the Rio de Janeiro tournament held from 29 November to 2 December, Tomar was one of 9 gold medallists from the Indian contingent which included 4 bronze medals as well.

2013 Commonwealth Wrestling Championships 
In the men's freestyle 55 kg category at the tournament held in Johannesburg, South Africa, Tomar won the gold medal ahead of Narender from India and Bokan Masunyane from South Africa.

2015 Pro Wrestling League 
Sandeep was the third Indian male wrestler acquired by the Bangalore franchise (owned by JSW Sport) of the Pro Wrestling League. His final bid amount was Rs 10.3 lakh.

The 2015 Pro Wrestling League was scheduled to be held from 10 December to 27 December across 6 cities.

2016 Olympic Games, Rio de Janeiro 
Qualified for India, in men's 57 kg free style and lost to Viktor Lebedev 7-3

Other titles 
 Dave Schultz Memorial Tournament, 2013 - Bronze
 Dave Schultz Memorial Tournament, 2014 - Bronze
 World Military Championship, USA, 2014 - Gold
 Takhiti Cup, Iran, 2015 - Bronze

References

External links 
 Sandeep Tomar - FILA database

1992 births
Living people
Indian male sport wrestlers
Sportspeople from Baghpat district
Olympic wrestlers of India
Wrestlers at the 2016 Summer Olympics
Wrestlers at the 2018 Asian Games
Asian Games competitors for India
Asian Wrestling Championships medalists